The 1990 Virginia Tech Hokies football team represented the Virginia Polytechnic Institute and State University during the 1990 NCAA Division I-A football season. The team's head coach was Frank Beamer.

Schedule

Roster

Game summaries

at Georgia Tech

Source: Box score

Virginia

VT: Poindexter 3 run (Thomas kick)
VT: Cullen 29 pass from Furrer (Thomas kick)
VT: Thomas 21 FG
VT: Daniels 33 pass from Furrer (Thomas kick)
UVA: Kirby 3 pass from Blundin (kick blocked)
UVA: H. Moore 66 pass from Blundin (McInarney kick)
VT: Hebron 9 run (Thomas kick)
VT: Poindexter 3 pass from Furrer (Thomas kick)
Rushing: UVA – Kirby 10–44; VT – Hebron 31-142
Passing: UVA – Blundin 21-34-3-305; VT – Furrer 16-23-254
Receiving: UVA – H. Moore 6–180; VT – Campbell 4-94

References

Virginia Tech
Virginia Tech Hokies football seasons
Virginia Tech Hokies football